In Greek mythology, Ilione or Iliona (Ancient Greek: Ἰλίωνα) was a Trojan princess who later became a queen of Thrace. She is briefly mentioned in Virgil's Aeneid: Aeneas gives her scepter to Dido.

Family 
Ilione was the oldest daughter of King Priam and Queen Hecuba of Troy. Her husband was the Thracian king Polymestor.

Mythology 
Ilione played a significant role in a version of the story of her younger brother Polydorus. 

She and her husband, Polymestor, were entrusted by her parents to the care of the young prince, Polydorus. Ilione, who already had a son of her own, Deipylus, brought her brother up as her son, and her son as her brother, thinking that if anything happened to one of them, she could return the other one to her parents in any case. So when Polymestor was instigated by the Greeks to kill the son of Priam, he killed Deipylus instead, his own son, taking him for Polydorus. The real Polydorus thus survived and escaped. Later, he went to inquire the oracle at Delphi about his parents, and was answered that his native city had been destroyed, father killed and mother enslaved. Still thinking that he was the son of Polymestor and Ilione, Polydorus thought that the oracle must have been wrong and asked Ilione about it. She told him all the truth and suggested that he should take revenge on Polymestor; Polydorus then blinded and killed him.

Ilione was said to have eventually committed suicide, grieving at her parents' deaths.

Her story was the subject of early Roman tragedies by Pacuvius and Accius.

Notes

References 

 Gaius Julius Hyginus, Fabulae from The Myths of Hyginus translated and edited by Mary Grant. University of Kansas Publications in Humanistic Studies. Online version at the Topos Text Project.
Maurus Servius Honoratus, In Vergilii carmina comentarii. Servii Grammatici qui feruntur in Vergilii carmina commentarii; recensuerunt Georgius Thilo et Hermannus Hagen. Georgius Thilo. Leipzig. B. G. Teubner. 1881. Online version at the Perseus Digital Library.
Publius Vergilius Maro, Aeneid. Theodore C. Williams. trans. Boston. Houghton Mifflin Co. 1910. Online version at the Perseus Digital Library.
Publius Vergilius Maro, Bucolics, Aeneid, and Georgics. J. B. Greenough. Boston. Ginn & Co. 1900. Latin text available at the Perseus Digital Library.
Princesses in Greek mythology
Children of Priam

Women of the Trojan war
Trojans
Suicides in Greek mythology